SG Stadtmitte Berlin was a short-lived German association football club from the city of Berlin and play its home fixtures at Chaussenstase. Established in 1945, it was part of the postwar Stadtliga Berlin which was the top-flight city competition active immediately after World War II. They earned a second-place result in the league's Staffel D in 1945–46 and the following season became part of the Oberliga Berlin (I). The club disappeared in 1947 following an 11th-place result there.

References

External links
Das deutsche Fußball-Archiv historical German domestic league tables 

Football clubs in Germany
Defunct football clubs in Germany
Stadtmitte
1945 establishments in Germany
1947 disestablishments in Germany
Association football clubs established in 1945
Association football clubs disestablished in 1947